Coleophora chumanensis is a moth of the family Coleophoridae. It is found in the lower Volga area in southern Russia.

The larvae feed on Salsola tragus.

References

chumanensis
Moths described in 2005
Moths of Europe